William N. Thompson House, also known as Old Governor's Mansion, is a historic home located at Indianapolis, Marion County, Indiana.  It was built in 1920, and is Georgian Revival style buff-colored brick mansion.  It consists of a two-story, five-bay, central section flanked by one-story wings.  It has a slate hipped roof and features a full width front porch and an elliptical portico at the main entry. The house served as the Governor's Mansion from 1945 to 1970.

It was added to the National Register of Historic Places in 1982.  It is located in the North Meridian Street Historic District.

References

Individually listed contributing properties to historic districts on the National Register in Indiana
Houses on the National Register of Historic Places in Indiana
Georgian Revival architecture in Indiana
Houses completed in 1920
Houses in Indianapolis
National Register of Historic Places in Indianapolis
Former governors' mansions in the United States